In mathematical analysis, a Young measure is a parameterized measure that is associated with certain subsequences of a given bounded sequence of measurable functions. They are a quantification of the oscillation effect of the sequence in the limit.  Young measures have applications in the calculus of variations, especially models from material science, and the study of nonlinear partial differential equations, as well as in various optimization (or optimal control problems).  They are named after Laurence Chisholm Young who invented them, already in 1937 in one dimension (curves) and later in higher dimensions in 1942.

Definition

The measures  are called the Young measures generated by the sequence .

Young's original idea in the case  was to for each integer  consider the uniform measure, let's say  concentrated on graph of the function  (Here, is the restriction of the Lebesgue measure on ) By taking the weak-star limit of these measures as elements of  we have  where  is the mentioned weak limit. After a disintegration of the  measure  on the product space  we get the parameterized measure .

Example

This captures the essential features of all minimizing sequences to this problem, namely .

References

 
 
 
 
 
 

 
, memoir presented by Stanisław Saks at the session of 16 December 1937 of the Warsaw Society of Sciences and Letters. The free PDF copy is made available by the RCIN –Digital Repository of the Scientifics Institutes.
.

External links

 

Measures (measure theory)